Jack Christopher (foaled 30 January 2019) is a multiple Grade I-winning American Thoroughbred racehorse who won the Grade I Champagne Stakes as a two-year-old and the Woody Stephens Stakes and  H. Allen Jerkens Memorial Stakes in 2022.

Background
Jack Christopher is a chestnut colt that was bred in Kentucky by Castleton Lyons & Kilboy Estate. His sire is Munnings who ran second in the 2008 renewal of Champagne Stakes and stands at Ashford Stud and his dam is Rushin No Blushin who was sired by Half Ours. Rushin No Blushin is a half sister to multiple Grade I winner and sire Street Boss.

Jack Christopher was bought for $135,000 from Paramount Sales' consignment to the 2020 Fasig-Tipton Kentucky October Yearlings Sale.

Racing career

2021: Two-year-old season
Jack Christopher began his racing career on 28 August in a Maiden Special Weight event over 6 furlongs at Saratoga Race Course. Starting as the 11/10 favorite in a field of 7 began sharply with good speed and forged three wide on the turn entering the straight where he powered by and kicked clear winning impressively by  lengths. Such was his performance that trainer Chad Brown entered the colt to the Grade I Champagne Stakes at Belmont Park. Nearly five weeks later Jack Christopher was made  the heavy favorite over Gunite and Wit. The latter won the Grade III Sanford Stakes and was the only other stakes winner in the field. Gunite shook free in the early going to take the lead but Jack Christopher moved quickly into a stalking position. With the shake of the right rein from jockey Ortiz, Jack Christopher pulled away and never faced a serious challenge winning by  lengths in a time of 1:36.72. Jack Christopher earned points for the Kentucky Derby as well as automatic entry for the Breeders' Cup Juvenile to be held at Del Mar.

However, Jack Christopher was scratched the day before the Breeders' Cup Juvenile on the advice of Breeders' Cup veterinarians. Due to a couple areas lighting up (on a bone scan), mainly the left shin, he had a had a screw inserted on that shin by orthopedic surgeon Dr. Larry Bramlage and was sidelined for two months.

2022: Three-year-old season

Jack Christopher resumed training after his operation on 27 February in Florida which was deemed to late for preparations for the Kentucky Derby. After gradual spaced training of ten spaced works connections entered Jack Christopher in the Pat Day Mile Stakes over a distance of one mile which was held on the Kentucky Derby undercard. Jack Christopher was made the 7/10 odds-on favorite in a field of eleven three-year-olds. After pressing the pace of early leader Pappacap in the Pat Day Mile, he pulled away to decisively score by  lengths in a time of 1:34.81. Trainer Chad Brown commented, "It's a little bittersweet that we did get him to the first Saturday in May, which we had been thinking about since he debuted up at Saratoga, that unbelievable performance. To get him to the first Saturday in May and have him roar down the stretch and get to the winner's circle but not be in the race that's a few races later, will always be in the back of my mind if he could have done it."

On 11 June, Belmont Stakes Day, Jack Christopher was entered in the Grade I Woody Stephens Stakes, a sprinting event for three-year-olds. Once again Jack Christopher dominated the field winning his fourth straight event and second Grade I with a powerful ten-length victory. Jack Christopher would press leader Provocateur through a half-mile in :45.38 before being pushed for more in early stretch. He then flashed his considerable talent as he drew off under a hand-ride into the last 100 yards and in deep stretch was saved for another day completing the seven furlongs in 1:21.18. Trainer Chad Brown commenting after the event, "I felt really good when Jose (Ortiz Jr.) slipped to the outside of the speed horse. The only thing I was worried about was Provocateur potentially really hounding us the whole race; potentially softening us up from a tricky post. Once Jose got him out in the clear, I didn't see any possible way this horse could lose." After the dominant win connections were indicating that Jack Christopher would attempt to run at a longer distance and challenge the premier three-year-olds.

Jack Christopher was entered in the Grade I Haskell Stakes at Monmouth Park at his first attempt in an event with two turns and a distance of  miles. Jack Christopher was installed as the 7/10 odds-on favorite in a tough field which included GI Arkansas Derby winner Cyberknife and Bob Baffert-trained Grade I Santa Anita Derby winner Taiba. Jack Christopher began well rated comfortably off of longshot Benevengo entering the clubhouse turn. He stalked close up two wide, then pressed the pace, bid two wide entering the far turn, dueled on the turn, put a head front at the quarter pole but was overtaken by Cyberknife and Taiba finishing third beaten by two lengths. Winner Cyberknife set a new track-record of 1:46.24 for the  miles distance. Chad Brown was positive after the race saying, "I felt very, very good turning for home. I thought it was a beautiful trip, but at the end of the day, I thought he (pushed) fair fractions. It's pretty simple we have to cut him back. Hats off to the winner. He looked the part of a real threat the entire race."

On August 27 returned to a sprinting event, the seven-furlong Grade I H. Allen Jerkens Memorial at Saratoga. Starting as the overwhelming favorite at 11/20 odds-on, Jack Christopher bounced in front but conceded the lead to Conagher. With three furlongs to run Ortiz guided Jack Christopher guided to the front and held Gunite off to a  lengths victory in a time of 1:21.15. Trainer Chad Brown said, "I'm just so proud of the horse. He's been a very consistent horse. He's never disappointed us in a workout or a race." Brown was noncommittal regarding what might be next for his trainee, but the Grade I Breeders' Cup Sprint and Grade I Breeders' Cup Dirt Mile  would appear to be options this fall at Keeneland.

Statistics

Notes:

An (*) asterisk after the odds means Jack Christopher was the post-time favourite.

Pedigree

Jack Christopher is inbred 4s × 4d to Storm Cat.

References

2019 racehorse births
Racehorses bred in Kentucky
Racehorses trained in the United States
Thoroughbred family 1-e
American Grade 1 Stakes winners